|}

The Kingmaker Novices' Chase is a Grade 2 National Hunt steeplechase in Great Britain which is open to horses aged five years or older. It is run at Warwick over a distance of about 1 miles 7½ (1 mile 7 furlongs and 119 yards, or 3,126 metres), and during its running there are twelve fences to be jumped. The race is for novice chasers, and it is scheduled to take place each year in February.

The event was established in 1991, and it was originally contested in May over a distance of 2 miles and 4½ furlongs (4,124 metres). It was switched to February in 1996, and at the same time its length was cut to 2 miles. This was extended by 110 yards in 2000. The race was abandoned at Warwick in 2005, 2006 and 2007, and it was transferred on each occasion to Wincanton. At this venue it was run over 2 miles, and there were thirteen fences to jump. This distance was kept when it returned to Warwick in 2008.

The title of the race refers to the 16th Earl of Warwick, who was known as the "Kingmaker" during the Wars of the Roses.

Records
Leading jockey (3 wins):
 Robert Thornton – Flagship Uberalles (1999), Kadount (2005), Voy Por Ustedes (2006)

Leading trainer (5 wins):
 Paul Nicholls - Lake Kariba (1998), Flagship Uberalles (1999), Whitenzo (2001), Armaturk (2002), 	Vibrato Valtat (2015)

Winners

See also
 Horse racing in Great Britain
 List of British National Hunt races

References

 Racing Post:

 pedigreequery.com – Kingmaker Novices' Chase.

National Hunt races in Great Britain
Warwick Racecourse
National Hunt chases
Recurring sporting events established in 1991
1991 establishments in England